Geiszler is a surname. Notable people with the surname include:

Arland Geiszler, former mayor of Rugby, North Dakota
Johann Geiszler (born 1926), Austrian rower
Newton Geiszler, character in the Pacific Rim film series

See also
Geiseler